Hazard is a 1921 German silent drama film directed by Frederik Larsen and starring Carola Toelle, Anton Edthofer and Ressel Orla.

The film's sets were designed by the art director Fritz Lederer.

Cast
 Carola Toelle as Die Sekretärin 
 Anton Edthofer as Ihr Bruder, der Gentleman Dieb 
 Ressel Orla as De grand Mondaine 
 Ernst Stahl-Nachbaur as Der strenge Gatte 
 Fritz Schulz as Hehler 
 Charles Puffy as Hehler 
 Josef Commer
 Hans Junkermann
 Karl Platen

References

Bibliography
 Wolfgang Jacobsen, Jörg Schöning & Rudolf Arnheim. Erich Pommer: ein Produzent macht Filmgeschichte. Argon, 1989.

External links

1921 films
Films of the Weimar Republic

German silent feature films
German black-and-white films
German drama films
1921 drama films
Silent drama films
1920s German films
1920s German-language films